Kobilje is a village and a municipality in the Prekmurje region of Slovenia.

Kobilje may also refer to:

In Slovenia:
Kobilje Creek, left tributary of the Ledava River in northeastern Slovenia and western Hungary

In Serbia:
 Kobilje, Kruševac, a village
 Kobilje, Malo Crniće, a village
 Kobilje (Brus), a village

See also 
 Kobjeglava, a village in the Littoral region of Slovenia
 Kobilja (disambiguation)